Ectoedemia mahalebella is a moth of the family Nepticulidae. It is found from the Czech Republic and Slovakia to the Pyrenees, Italy and Greece.

The wingspan is 4.3–5.3 mm. Adults are on wing from May to June. There is one generation per year.

The larvae feed on Prunus avium, Prunus cerasifera, Prunus cerasus, Prunus cocomilia, Prunus domestica, Prunus fruticosa, Prunus mahaleb, Prunus spinosa and Prunus tenella. They mine the leaves of their host plant. The mine consists of a narrow corridor, filled with reddish frass. Normally, the corridor is strongly contorted, unless it follows the leaf margin. The corridor widens into a small, round blotch. In the blotch, the frass is blackish and concentrated in the centre.

External links
Fauna Europaea
bladmineerders.nl
A Taxonomic Revision Of The Western Palaearctic Species Of The Subgenera Zimmermannia Hering And Ectoedemia Busck s.str. (Lepidoptera, Nepticulidae), With Notes On Their Phylogeny

Nepticulidae
Moths of Europe
Moths described in 1936